Nicolas Lüchinger (born 16 October 1994) is a Swiss professional footballer who plays as a right back for Thun in the Swiss Challenge League on loan from St. Gallen.

Club career
Lüchinger made his Swiss Super League debut with FC Sion on 10 August 2016 against FC Lugano.

On 12 July 2022, Lüchinger joined Thun on a season-long loan.

References

1994 births
Sportspeople from the canton of St. Gallen
Living people
Association football defenders
Swiss men's footballers
Switzerland youth international footballers
FC St. Gallen players
FC Sion players
FC Chiasso players
FC Thun players
Swiss 1. Liga (football) players
Swiss Promotion League players
Swiss Challenge League players
Swiss Super League players